Damochlora spina is a species of air-breathing land snails, terrestrial pulmonate gastropod mollusks. This species is endemic to Australia.

References

Gastropods of Australia
Damochlora
Vulnerable fauna of Australia
Gastropods described in 1985
Taxonomy articles created by Polbot
Taxobox binomials not recognized by IUCN